The Acton School of Business is a school for entrepreneurship located in Madrid, Spain after losing its accreditation in Texas. Offering a full-time program, the school is based on experiential learning.

Acton originally offered an accelerated MBA program in Austin from 2002 to 2019. The school was accredited by the Southern Association of Colleges and Schools and the Association of Collegiate Business Schools and Programs through Hardin-Simmons University. Due to funding cuts at Hardin-Simmons, Acton lost its accreditation with SACS and closed its Austin campus, but reopened in Madrid, Spain, and is accredited though Universidad Francisco Marroquin. It has maintained its one year, 100 hour week course model and all classes are taught in English.

History 
The school derives its name from Lord Acton, a 19th-century scholar and originator of the famous quote "Power tends to corrupt, and absolute power corrupts absolutely."

In October 2018, due to a loss of funding, Hardin-Simmons University ended a number of programs. This included closure of its Acton MBA Program campus extension, which terminated Acton's accreditation after 2019. Acton has since moved from Austin to Madrid, Spain and is accredited through Universidad Francisco Marroquin.

In December 2018, the school accepted applications for the Peterson Fellowship in association with Jordan Peterson for the class of December 2019.

Program 
Using case reviews, Socratic discussions, exercises and business simulations, Acton offers its MBA entrepreneurship program in under a year. Unlike traditional MBA programs, Acton offers only a core curriculum with no additional elective courses.

The average undergraduate GPA of an admitted student is 3.3, the average age is 30 (median is 29), and the average GMAT score is 637. In 2009, Founder Jeff Sandefer and his wife Laura founded Acton Academy, a system of charter schools that use the Socratic method and similar philosophies to the Acton MBA program. There are now over 300 Acton Academies worldwide.

Notable alumni 
Notable alumni from Acton include Adelle Archer, CEO and founder of Eterneva, which received an investment from Mark Cuban on Shark Tank; U.S. Olympic team member Trey Hardee; and Rep. David Eastman (R) of the Alaska House of Representatives.

References

External links 
 The Acton School of Business
 The Acton Foundation for Entrepreneurial Excellence
 Acton Academy

Business schools in Texas
Educational institutions established in 2002
Private universities and colleges in Texas
Universities and colleges in Austin, Texas
2002 establishments in Texas